Rafael Nadal defeated Stan Wawrinka in the final, 6–2, 6–3, 6–1 to win the men's singles tennis title at the 2017 French Open. It was his record-extending tenth French Open title and 15th major title overall. Nadal became the first man to win 10 singles titles at the same major. He won the title without losing a set for a record-equaling third time (tying Björn Borg), not losing more than four games in any set played. He lost only 35 games during the tournament, his personal best, and the second-best in the tournament's history after Borg in 1978. Nadal also became the third man after Ken Rosewall and Pete Sampras to win a major title in his teens, twenties, and thirties.

Novak Djokovic was the defending champion, but lost to Dominic Thiem in the quarterfinals. Djokovic was attempting to become the first man in the Open Era to achieve a double career Grand Slam (he would later achieve this feat in 2021). This was the first time since 2010 that he did not reach at least the semifinals at the French Open, and the first time since 2009 that he lost a French Open match in straight sets.

The hard-fought semifinal between Wawrinka and Andy Murray marked the end for both players at the top of the sport, as both suffered injuries that took them out of the game for months from which they did not reclaim their prior preeminence.

This marked the first major appearance of future ATP Finals champion and French Open and Australian Open finalist Stefanos Tsitsipas, who lost to Ivo Karlović in the first round.

Seeds

Draw

Finals

Top half

Section 1

Section 2

Section 3

Section 4

Bottom half

Section 5

Section 6

Section 7

Section 8

Seeded players
The following are the seeded players. Seedings are based on 22 May 2017. Rank and points before are as of 29 May 2017.

Because the tournament takes place one week later than in 2016, points defending includes results from both the 2016 French Open and tournaments from the week of 6 June 2016 (Stuttgart and 's-Hertogenbosch).

† The player did not qualify for the tournament in 2016. Accordingly, points for his 18th best result are deducted instead.

Withdrawn players
The following player would have been seeded, but withdrew from the event.

Other entry information

Wild cards

Protected ranking

Qualifiers

Lucky loser
  Andrey Rublev

Withdrawals

Retirements

Notes

References

External links

Official Roland Garros 2017 Men's Singles Draw
2017 French Open – Men's draws and results at the International Tennis Federation

Men's Singles
French Open by year – Men's singles
French Open - Men's Singles